The İpek Detachment of the Ottoman Empire (Turkish: İpek Müfrezesi) was one of the Detachment under the command of the Ottoman Western Army. It was formed in İpek (present day: Peć) area during the First Balkan War.

Balkan Wars

Order of Battle, October 19, 1912 
On October 19, 1912, the detachment was structured as follows:

İpek Detachment HQ (Montenegrin Front, under the command of the Western Army)
21st Division
61st Infantry Regiment
62nd Infantry Regiment
Pirzerin Redif Division

Sources

Detachment of the Ottoman Empire
Military units and formations of the Ottoman Empire in the Balkan Wars
Ottoman period in the history of Kosovo